Stefan is an album led by trumpeter Dennis González which was recorded in 1987 and released on the Swedish Silkheart label.

Reception 

The Penguin Guide to Jazz notes "Stefan is probably the trumpeter's masterpiece ... a masterful record". In his review for AllMusic, Brian Olewnick states "Stefan is arguably one of Gonzalez' best efforts, and is decidedly one of the better entryways into his unique world. Recommended".

Track listing 
All compositions by Dennis González except where noted.

 "Enrico" – 7:47
 "Fortuity" (W.A. Richardson, Ronie Boykins) – 2:28
 "Stefan" – 8:00
 "Hymn for Don Cherry" – 5:52
 "Boi Fuba" (Traditional) – 3:07
 "Deacin John Ray" (John Purcell) – 9:29
 "Doxology" – 6:34 Bonus track on CD release

Personnel 
Dennis González – trumpet, flugelhorn, berimbau
John Purcell – bass clarinet, alto saxophone, flute (tracks 1–5)
Malachi Favors (track 6), Henry Franklin (tracks 1–5) – bass
W. A. Richardson – drums

References 

1987 albums
Dennis González albums
Silkheart Records albums